The Bouvet-class was a type of sail and steam avisos  of the French Navy. Design by Vésigné and La Celle, the ships had a clipper hull, barque rigging and a steam engine with one propeller. They were armed with one 160mm gun and two 120mm guns. Bruat (1867) is sometimes counted among this class.

A model of Bouvet, lead ship of the class, is now on display at Paris naval museum.

Bouvet
Builder: 
Begun:
Launched: 1865
Completed:
Fate:

Guichen
Builder: 
Begun:
Launched: 1867
Completed:
Fate:

Sources and references

References